Tiroche Auction House is an auction house in Israel.

History
Tiroche was founded in 1992 and has organized over 170 auctions. It holds four large auctions a year of Israeli and international art (paintings) and decorative art; silverware, jewelry, Judaica, clocks, carpets, porcelain and more.

It specializes in the evaluation and sale of art. Tiroche enables the sale of art through live auctions, bi-weekly online auctions, private sales and an online store.

Auctions of important estates include the estates of Baroness Batsheva de Rothschild, Suzy and Abba Eban, Ephraim Kishon, Yitzhak Rabin, Golda Meir and many others. In 2014, Tiroche was chosen by the court to execute the auction of the IDB Holdings art collection as part of the debt arrangement, in which 100% of the items were sold. |Records were set for many Israeli artists such as Lea Nikel, Rafi Lavie, Nir Hod, Eli Shamir and more. Tiroche also holds price records for most Israeli artists, such as Yosef Zaritsky, Moshe Gershuni and Moshe Kupferman.

In recent years, the Auction house staff has volunteered to donate time and experience to carry out auctions for the Israeli Spirit Association, Schneider Children's Hospital, Beit Issie Shapiro," Latet", "One of Nine", and more.

Today Tiroche Auction house is managed by Dov Hazan and his two children, Galia and Amitai Hazan Tiroche. The Tiroche Family connection to the art world began back in the 1950s, when Jean Tiroche immigrated to Israel and established the first art galleries In Israel. Jean's daughter, Orna, married Dov and together they operated two art galleries in Tel Aviv and Jaffa for 20 years. In 1992, Dov Hazan and Mickey Tiroche established the Auction House, which was joined in 2007 by Galia and Amitai.

See also
Visual arts in Israel

References

External links
 Official website

Israeli auction houses
Privately held companies of Israel
Retail companies established in 1992
Israeli art dealers
1992 in art
Israeli companies established in 1992